George Blues is an Australian former international soccer player who played as a winger.

Career
Born in Scotland, Blues began his career with Dundee. He played junior football with Bonnyvale Star, before playing in the Scottish Football League for Falkirk, Berwick Rangers, Alloa Athletic and Raith Rovers. After spells in South Africa with Johannesburg Wanderers and Durban City, Blues moved to Australia to play for APIA Leichhardt Tigers.

Blues made three official international appearances for Australia, and 16 in total including unofficial exhibition matches.

References

1930s births
Living people
Association football wingers
Scottish footballers
Australian soccer players
Australia international soccer players
Dundee F.C. players
Falkirk F.C. players
Berwick Rangers F.C. players
Alloa Athletic F.C. players
Raith Rovers F.C. players
Scottish Football League players
Durban City F.C. players
Year of birth missing (living people)